Library and Laboratory Building-Henderson Institute is a historic school building located at Henderson, Vance County, North Carolina.  It was built in 1928, and is a plain, two-story brick building with Colonial Revival style design elements.  It is the only surviving reminder of the Henderson Institute that was established in the town of Henderson in Vance County in 1887.  The Henderson Institute was established by the Freedmen's Mission Board of the United Presbyterian Church of North America to provide secondary education for African-Americans.  The building houses the Henderson Institute Historical Museum.

It was listed on the National Register of Historic Places in 1995.

References

External links
Henderson Institute Historical Museum - official site
Henderson Institute Graduates and Former Students Association, Inc. website

Museums in Vance County, North Carolina
African-American history of North Carolina
School buildings on the National Register of Historic Places in North Carolina
Colonial Revival architecture in North Carolina
School buildings completed in 1928
Buildings and structures in Vance County, North Carolina
National Register of Historic Places in Vance County, North Carolina
African-American museums in North Carolina
1928 establishments in North Carolina